Wanida Boonwan (born 30 August 1986 in Ubon Ratchathani) is a Thai athlete competing in the high jump. She competed at the 2012 Summer Olympics failing to qualify for the final.

Her personal bests in the event are 1.92 metres outdoors (Kunshan 2011) and 1.91 metres indoors (Hanoi 2009).

International competitions

References 

1986 births
Living people
Wanida Boonwan
Wanida Boonwan
Wanida Boonwan
Athletes (track and field) at the 2012 Summer Olympics
Wanida Boonwan
Athletes (track and field) at the 2010 Asian Games
Athletes (track and field) at the 2014 Asian Games
Athletes (track and field) at the 2018 Asian Games
Southeast Asian Games medalists in athletics
Wanida Boonwan
Wanida Boonwan
Wanida Boonwan
Competitors at the 2007 Southeast Asian Games
Competitors at the 2009 Southeast Asian Games
Competitors at the 2011 Southeast Asian Games
Competitors at the 2013 Southeast Asian Games
Competitors at the 2015 Southeast Asian Games
Competitors at the 2017 Southeast Asian Games
Wanida Boonwan
Competitors at the 2019 Southeast Asian Games
Wanida Boonwan